In the mythology of Fiji, Ratumaibulu is a god of great importance who presides over agriculture. In the month called Vula-i-Ratumaibulu, he comes from Bulu, the world of spirits, to make the breadfruit and other fruit trees blossom and yield fruit. He is said to be a snake god.

See also
Nabagatai

Notes

References
The Journal of the Royal Astronomical Society of Canada, 1907.
Freese, John, The Philosophy of the Immortality of the Soul and the Resurrection of the Human Body. Facsimile reprint of 1864 edition. Kessinger Publishing, 2005, .
T. Williams, J. Calvert, Fiji and the Fijians, Heylin, 1858.

Agricultural gods
Fertility gods
Fijian deities
Snake gods